Aliaksandra Aliaksandraŭna Sasnovich (born 22 March 1994) is a Belarusian tennis player. She achieved her best singles ranking of world No. 29 on 19 September 2022, and peaked at No. 39 in the WTA doubles rankings, on 23 August 2021. She has won eleven singles and seven doubles titles on the ITF Circuit. She has reached a Grand-Slam semifinal in doubles, at the 2019 US Open, together with Viktoria Kuzmova.

Personal life and background
She has a mother named Natalia and a younger sister named Polina. She came from a sporty family. Her mother played basketball while her father played hockey and tennis for 20 years on the senior circuit. Sasnovich started playing tennis at the age of nine, and her father introduced her to sport. She stated that her favorite shot is backhand down the line, while her favorite surface is indoor hardcourt. Her favorite tournaments are the US Open and the Stuttgart Open. Sasnovich is studying for a physical culture degree at university in Minsk. She speaks Belarusian, Russian, English and a little French.

National representation

Fed Cup 
Playing for Belarus in Billie Jean King Cup, Sasnovich has a win–loss record of 25–16. This record includes a 4–0 run in the first two rounds of the 2017 Fed Cup World Group, which propelled Belarus to upset victories against Netherlands and Switzerland and helped them reach their first Fed Cup final. In the final against United States, Sasnovich first lost to CoCo Vandeweghe in the straight-sets, but then made a win over Sloane Stephens. In a decisive doubles-match, Sasnovich and Aryna Sabalenka lost to Shelby Rogers and Vandeweghe.

Career overview

2009–17: First steps, Major debut, maiden WTA final & top-10 win

Sasnovich made her ITF Women's Circuit debut at the $50k Minsk qualifying in November 2009. In October 2011, she won her first ITF singles title at the $10K event in Cagliari. In February 2012, she won her first ITF doubles title at a $10k event in Tallinn. In October 2013, she won the $100k Poitiers, defeating Sofia Arvidsson in the final. The following week, she won the $50K Nantes, defeating Magda Linette in the final. At the 2013 Brussels Open, she made her WTA Tour debut in doubles, while her singles debut was at the 2014 US Open.
In September 2015, she reached her first WTA singles final at the Korea Open, but lost to Irina-Camelia Begu. At the Premier-level Pan Pacific Open in 2016, she recorded her first top-10 win, defeating world No. 6, Karolína Plíšková, and reached the quarterfinal, where she lost to Naomi Osaka. In the first half of 2017, she reached the quarterfinal of the Hungarian Ladies Open and the semifinal of the Open Biel/Bienne. In October 2017, she reached the quarterfinal of the Premier-level Kremlin Cup, but lost to Daria Kasatkina.

2018: Most successful season, Major fourth round, top 30 debut

Sasnovich started the season well, reaching her first Premier final at the Brisbane International, where she lost against the third seed Elina Svitolina.

At the Australian Open, she won against Christina McHale and Mirjana Lučić-Baroni before she was stopped in the third round by the eighth seed Caroline Garcia. At the Indian Wells Open, she also reached the third round, where she lost to Caroline Wozniacki. She reached the second round of the Miami Open, Madrid Open and French Open.

She then reached fourth round of Wimbledon, her best Grand Slam run to date, including a win over the two-time Wimbledon champion Petra Kvitová. She followed this with wins over Taylor Townsend and Daria Gavrilova, before she lost to former Wimbledon semifinalist Jeļena Ostapenko. At the Moscow River Cup, she reached the semi-finals, where she lost to the eventual champion Olga Danilović.

At the US Open, she defeated the world No. 11, Daria Kasatkina, to reach the third round, but then lost to eventual champion Naomi Osaka with a double bagel. She finished the year with a quarter-final at the Kremlin Cup after registering a top-10 win over Kiki Bertens in the second round, losing to Johanna Konta.

2019: US Open doubles semifinal
In the first week of the year, Sasnovich had a top-10 win over Elina Svitolina, and reached the quarterfinal, where she lost to Donna Vekić. The following week, she had another top-10 win over world No. 10, Daria Kasatkina, and reached the semifinal of the Sydney International, where she lost to Petra Kvitová. At the Australian Open, she reached her second consecutive third round there, this time losing to Anastasia Pavlyuchenkova. At the Madrid Open, she defeated world No. 15, Anett Kontaveit, in the first round, but later lost to world No. 1 Naomi Osaka in the third round. She finished year at the Open de Limoges, a WTA Challenger event, losing to Ekaterina Alexandrova in the final. In doubles, she reached the third round of the Australian Open, the quarterfinal of the Italian Open and then she reached her first Grand Slam semifinal at the US Open. There, alongside Viktória Kužmová, she lost to Victoria Azarenka/Ashleigh Barty.

2020: US Open singles third round, French Open doubles QF
In the first half of the year, Sasnovich did not produce any significant results. After five months of tennis absence due to the COVID-19 pandemic, she played at the Palermo Ladies Open, where she reached the quarterfinal but then lost her match to Petra Martić. At the US Open, she defeated world No. 19, Markéta Vondroušová, and reached the third round, in which she lost to Yulia Putintseva. The following week, she played at the İstanbul Cup where she reached the quarterfinals. After losing in the second round of the French Open in singles, she reached the quarterfinals in doubles, alongside Marta Kostyuk. She finished her year with a quarterfinal entry at the Linz Open.

2021: Wimbledon third round, win over Serena Williams, WTA 1000 fourth round
Sasnovich reached the third round at Wimbledon for the second time in her career, defeating Serena Williams, who retired in the first round, and Nao Hibino in the second round. 

At the Indian Wells Open, Sasnovich upset reigning US Open champion and 17th seed, Emma Raducanu, in the second round, 6–2, 6–4. She continued with upseting another Grand Slam champion and former No. 1, Simona Halep, in the following round.

2022: Third WTA Tour final, Miami & French Open fourth round
As a qualifier, Sasnovich reached the final of the Melbourne Summer Set 2 where she lost to Amanda Anisimova. She defeated two seeded players, Clara Tauson and Ann Li, on the way to the final.
At the Australian Open, she lost to qualifier Zheng Qinwen, in the first round.

At the French Open, she defeated Emma Raducanu for the second time in eight months to advance to the third round at this major for the first time in her career thus completing the third round career set at all Grand Slam tournaments. She went one step further defeating 21st seed Angelique Kerber to reach the fourth round.

Performance timelines

Only main-draw results in WTA Tour, Grand Slam tournaments, Fed Cup/Billie Jean King Cup and Olympic Games are included in win–loss records.

Singles
Current through the 2023 Indian Wells Open.

Doubles
Current through the 2023 Australian Open.

WTA career finals

Singles: 4 (4 runner–ups)

WTA Challenger finals

Singles: 1 (runner-up)

ITF Circuit finals

Singles: 11 (11 titles)

Doubles: 9 (7 titles, 2 runner–ups)

Fed Cup participation

Singles: 30 (17–13)

Doubles: 11 (8–3)

WTA Tour career earnings
Current through the 2022 French Open

Head-to-head records

Record against top 10 players
Sasnovich's record against players who have been ranked in the top 10. Active players are in boldface.

Top 10 wins

Notes

References

External links

 
 
 

1994 births
Living people
Tennis players from Minsk
Belarusian female tennis players
21st-century Belarusian women